The 1962 season in Swedish football, starting April 1962 and ending November 1962:

Honours

Official titles

Notes

References 
Online

 
Seasons in Swedish football